This is a list of mayors of Mayagüez, located on the west coast of Puerto Rico.

19th century

20th century

See also

Mayoralty in Puerto Rico
 Timeline of Mayagüez, Puerto Rico
Mayagüez, Puerto Rico
Puerto Rico

References

Bibliography
Mayaguez: Notas para su Historia; Silvia Aguilo Ramos, 1984, San Juan, Model Offset Printing
Genealogia Biografias e Historias de Mayagüez de Ayer y Hoy y Antologia Puerto Rico; Martin Gaudier, 1959, San German, Imprenta "El Aguila"
  (About Bejamín Cole era)

Mayaguez